Kenneth Gustafsson is a Swedish footballer who last played for Swedish side Gunnilse IS in the Swedish second division, which is the 4th highest in Sweden. He has earlier represented clubs in the top leagues in Sweden, Norway, Finland and Iceland.

References
 Guardian Football

1982 births
Living people
Swedish footballers
Malmö FF players
IFK Mariehamn players
Trelleborgs FF players
Lyn Fotball players
Knattspyrnudeild Keflavík players
Expatriate footballers in Norway
Expatriate footballers in Iceland
Expatriate footballers in Finland
Swedish expatriate footballers
Swedish expatriate sportspeople in Norway
Swedish expatriate sportspeople in Iceland
Swedish expatriate sportspeople in Finland
Allsvenskan players
Division 2 (Swedish football) players
Eliteserien players
Veikkausliiga players
Association football central defenders